This was the first edition of the tournament.  Gero Kretschmer and Alexander Satschko won the title, defeating Víctor Estrella Burgos and João Souza in the final, 7–5, 7–6(7–3).

Seeds

Draw

Draw

References
 Main Draw

Ecuador Open Quito - Doubles
Ecuador Open (tennis)